The Federal Civil Aviation Agency (Agencia Federal de Aviación Civil, AFAC) is a division of the Secretariat of Communications and Transportation of Mexico. It replaced the former Dirección General de Aeronáutica Civil (Directorate General of Civil Aeronautics or DGAC) on October 16, 2019. is an agency of the Subsecretaría de Transporte of the Secretariat of Communications and Transportation of Mexico. Its main responsibilities is to act as civil aviation authority (CAA) and to investigate aviation accidents and incidents in Mexico.

History
The agency was originally established as the Dirección General de Aeronáutica Civil. Since December 2018, the DGAC's Director General is Lic. Rodrigo Vásquez-Colmenares Guzmán. He is the former CEO of TAR Aerolíneas.

On October 16, 2019, a decree in the Diario Oficial de la Federación created a new autonomous agency within the SCT, the Agencia Federal de Aviación Civil, to replace the DGAC. The new agency absorbs the old DGAC's assets, responsibilities and employees. The upgraded agency was designed in the wake of recommendations from the American International Aviation Safety Assessment Program, which suggested the creation of a new body with operational, technical and administrative autonomy.

Accident investigations
 Western Airlines Flight 2605
 2008 Mexico City plane crash
 2012 Mexico Learjet 25 crash
 AeroUnion Flight 302

References

External links

 Direction General of Civil Aeronautics - Secretariat of Communications and Transportation 
 DGAC - Mexico City International Airport
 Required Details for Obtaining Mexico Overflight Permit Application

Government of Mexico
Mexico
Mexico
Aviation organizations based in Mexico
Civil aviation in Mexico